Anthony Levine "Jam" Jones (born May 30, 1959) is a former American football running back who played for the Texas Longhorns from 1979 to 1982 and then in the National Football League for the Los Angeles Rams and Detroit Lions. Jones was drafted by the Rams in the eighth round of the 1982 NFL Draft.

College
Jones followed Earl Campbell as the starting running back for the Longhorns and in his first season led the Southwest Conference in Touchdowns. He led the team in rushing and several other statistical categories for all four years and finished as the 4th most productive running back in school history at the time. In his final game, he helped the Longhorns upset #3 Alabama in the 1982 Cotton Bowl.

NFL
Jones was drafted by the Rams in the 8th round of the NFL Draft. His only carries for the Rams came in a 51-7 playoff loss to the Washington Redskins in 1984. In 1985 Rams starter Eric Dickerson was a holdout and Jones saw more playing time in the preseason, scoring two TD's against the St. Louis Cardinals, but midway through the season, he was signed as a free agent by the Detroit Lions where he played in 8 games almost exclusively as a Kickoff Returner, but he also carried the ball once for two yards. He was waived by the Lions prior to the 1986 season.

References

1959 births
Living people
American football running backs
Los Angeles Rams players
Detroit Lions players
Texas Longhorns football players